Webster County is a county in the U.S. state of West Virginia. As of the 2020 census, the population was 8,378. Its county seat is Webster Springs. The county was founded in 1860 and named for Daniel Webster.

History
Webster County was formed from parts of Nicholas, Braxton, and Randolph counties in Virginia through the approval of an act of the Virginia General Assembly during its 1859-1860 session. Movement toward the formation of this county began in 1851.

Webster became part of West Virginia on June 20, 1863. When the state was formed, each county was divided into multiple civil townships, with the intention of encouraging local government. This proved impractical in the heavily rural state, so in 1872 the townships were converted into magisterial districts.

Webster County's three original townships, subsequently magisterial districts, were Fork Lick, Glade, and Holly.  A fourth district, Hacker Valley, was formed from part of Holly District in 1876.  The four historic magisterial districts remained largely unchanged until the 1990s, when they were consolidated into three new districts: Central, Northern, and Southern.

Geography

Major highways
  West Virginia Route 15
  West Virginia Route 20
  West Virginia Route 82

Adjacent counties
 Lewis County (north)
 Upshur County (north)
 Randolph County (east)
 Pocahontas County (southeast)
 Greenbrier County (south)
 Nicholas County (southwest)
 Braxton County (west)

National protected area
 Monongahela National Forest (part)

Demographics

2000 census
As of the census of 2000, there were 9,719 people, 4,010 households, and 2,815 families living in the county. The population density was 18 people per square mile (7/km2). There were 5,273 housing units at an average density of 10 per square mile (4/km2). The racial makeup of the county was 99.18% White, 0.01% Black or African American, 0.07% Native American, 0.06% Asian, 0.01% Pacific Islander, 0.01% from other races, and 0.66% from two or more races. 0.37% of the population were Hispanic or Latino of any race.

There were 4,010 households, out of which 29.80% had children under the age of 18 living with them, 55.40% were married couples living together, 10.60% had a female householder with no husband present, and 29.80% were non-families. 26.50% of all households were made up of individuals, and 12.40% had someone living alone who was 65 years of age or older. The average household size was 2.41 and the average family size was 2.89.

In the county, the population was spread out, with 23.00% under the age of 18, 8.00% from 18 to 24, 26.70% from 25 to 44, 27.10% from 45 to 64, and 15.20% who were 65 years of age or older. The median age was 40 years. For every 100 females there were 96.90 males. For every 100 females age 18 and over, there were 94.30 males.

The median income for a household in the county was $21,055, and the median income for a family was $25,049. Males had a median income of $25,362 versus $15,381 for females. The per capita income for the county was $12,284. About 26.60% of families and 31.80% of the population were below the poverty line, including 45.40% of those under age 18 and 21.00% of those age 65 or over.

2010 census
As of the 2010 United States census, there were 9,154 people, 3,792 households, and 2,595 families living in the county. The racial makeup of the county was 98.6% white, 0.2% black or African American, 0.1% Asian, 0.1% American Indian, 0.1% from other races, and 1.0% from two or more races. Those of Hispanic or Latino origin made up 0.5% of the population. In terms of ancestry, 19.8% were American, 15.7% were Irish, 12.6% were German, and 8.9% were English.

Of the 3,792 households, 30.1% had children under the age of 18 living with them, 51.8% were married couples living together, 11.2% had a female householder with no husband present, 31.6% were non-families, and 26.5% of all households were made up of individuals. The average household size was 2.40 and the average family size was 2.88. The median age was 44.1 years.

The median income for a household in the county was $28,025 and the median income for a family was $35,448. Males had a median income of $44,277 versus $19,292 for females. The per capita income for the county was $17,268. About 19.9% of families and 22.9% of the population were below the poverty line, including 26.4% of those under age 18 and 12.1% of those age 65 or over.

Politics
From 1864 through 2008, Webster County has voted Democratic in every presidential election except for 1972, where Richard Nixon carried the county by just 45 votes against George McGovern. However, in 2012 Mitt Romney carried the county handily with a 27.52% margin, in 2016 Donald Trump won by a margin of 57.90% and in 2020 he won again by a 63.2% margin, the highest margin of victory by any candidate in the county's history.

Communities

Towns
 Camden-on-Gauley
 Cowen
 Webster Springs (county seat; legally Town of Addison)

Magisterial districts

Current
 Central
 Northern
 Southern

Historic
 Fork Lick
 Glade
 Hacker Valley
 Holly

Census-designated places
 Bergoo
 Parcoal

Unincorporated communities

 Big Run
 Boggs
 Bolair
 Cherry Falls
 Cleveland
 Curtin
 Diana
 Donaldson
 Dyer
 Erbacon
 Excelsior
 Gauley Mills
 Guardian
 Hacker Valley
 Halo
 Replete
 Upperglade
 Wheeler

Notable person
 Josh Stewart, actor

See also
 Big Ditch Wildlife Management Area
 Holly River State Park
 National Register of Historic Places listings in Webster County, West Virginia
 Mountain Parkway Byway and Backway

Footnotes

References

Further reading
  (Historical sketches of Webster County)

External links

 Official website
 Official website of the Webster County Woodchopping Festival
 Two-Lane Livin' Magazine

 
1860 establishments in Virginia
Populated places established in 1860
Counties of Appalachia